Miccoli is a British, adult alternative/indie pop band from Birmingham, England. The group consists of siblings: twin brothers Adriano Miccoli (vocal and acoustic/electric guitar) Alessio Miccoli (piano, vocal and acoustic guitar) and sister Francesca Miccoli (vocal, piano and harmonica).

The band have had videos featured on VH1 and Bliss TV in the UK. With tracks also receiving air play on BBC Radio 2 and BBC Radio 6's Introducing.

References

External links
 

Family musical groups
Sibling musical trios
Musical groups established in 2012
English pop music groups
Musical groups from Birmingham, West Midlands
English rock music groups
2012 establishments in England